This article displays the qualifying draw for the Women's Singles at the 2001 French Open.

Seeds

Qualifiers

Lucky losers

Qualifying draw

First qualifier

Second qualifier

Third qualifier

Fourth qualifier

Fifth qualifier

Sixth qualifier

Seventh qualifier

Eighth qualifier

Ninth qualifier

Tenth qualifier

Eleventh qualifier

Twelfth qualifier

References
2001 French Open – Women's draws and results at the International Tennis Federation

Women's Singles Qualifying
French Open by year – Qualifying